The Ligier JS F3 is an open-wheel formula race car, designed, developed and produced by French manufacturer Ligier, in collaboration with Onroak Automotive, specifically built to FIA Formula 3 regulations, since 2018. It is used in the Formula Regional Americas Championship, and is powered by a  Honda K20C turbocharged four-cylinder. A modified version, known as the JS F3-S5000, is used in the Australian S5000 Championship, and is powered by a Ford Coyote naturally-aspirated V8 engine, producing .

References 

Open wheel racing cars
Formula Three cars
Ligier racing cars